Aeroflot Flight 2230 was a Soviet domestic passenger flight from Yekaterinburg (then Sverdlovsk) to Tashkent.  On 16 November 1967, the Ilyushin Il-18 aircraft serving the flight crashed after takeoff, killing all 107 people aboard (including twelve children). At the time it was the deadliest aviation accident in the Russian SFSR and the worst accident involving the Il-18.

Aircraft
The flight was serviced by an Ilyushin Il-18V turboprop airliner, manufactured on 25 March 1964 with a serial number 184007002. The aircraft made its maiden flight and commenced operations in the same year. On the day of the accident it had 5,326 flight hours, or 2,111 flight cycles.

Crew
The crew consisted of the pilot in command Yuri Abaturov, co-pilot Nikolai Mikhaylov, navigating officer Anatoly Zagorsky, flight engineer Viktor Ospishchev and radio officer Yuri Yefremov.

Accident
The aircraft was cleared for takeoff from Koltsovo Airport at 21:02 local time. The aircraft completely disintegrated, complicating the subsequent accident investigation. There were also fire outbreaks at the crash site.

The investigation said that the crash resulted from a wrong indication of the main artificial horizons and the compass system due to an electrical failure and that the flight crew was unable to determine the correct altitude.

References

Aviation accidents and incidents in 1967
Aviation accidents and incidents in the Soviet Union
Accidents and incidents involving the Ilyushin Il-18
2230
1967 in the Soviet Union
November 1967 events in Europe
Airliner accidents and incidents caused by engine failure